Pratima Barua Pandey  (3 October 1934 – 27 December 2002) was an Indian folk singer from the royal family of Gauripur in Western Assam's Dhubri district. Barua Pandey, a national awardee, best known for her Goalpariya (Koch Rajbongshi / Kamatapuri/ Deshi) songs Hastir Kanya and Mur Mahut Bandhure, was the daughter of Prakritish Chandra Barua (Lalji) and niece of filmmaker Pramathesh Barua
of Devdas fame.

Early life
Barua Pandey was born on 3 October 1934, in Calcutta. She pursued her early education in the city's Gokhale Memorial School, after which she came to Assam to study at the Girls’ High School, Gauripur, home of the royal family. She mostly spent her early years in between the din of Calcutta and the soothing environments of riverside "Gadadhar" at hometown Gauripur. Although she learned Rabindrasangeet at school, but she never took any formal training or teaching in music except the encouraging words from her father Prakritesh Chandra Barua (Lalji). The most crucial point in her life came when Dr. Bhupen Hazarika visited Gauripur in 1955 and attended a jalsa organised on a social occasion, the shy young Pratima, though tongue-tied with fear, let her voice and the lyrics of the lokageet in Goalpariya dialect flow in tune with the strings and rhythms of the dhol, junuka, dotora, darinda, dhuluki and Bashi which are musical instruments in Goalpariya culture. Dr. Hazarika was highly impressed and predicted that this voice would definitely take Goalpariya lokageet to great heights. Indeed, he first presented Goalpariya folk song in his film Era Bator Sur. Besides the mahout songs, Barua Pandey used to sing the evergreen hit We Are in the Same Boat, Brother in stage shows. She married Ganga Shanker Pandey, a retired principal of the Gauripur P. B. College. She was inspired from the old family traditions of elephant captiving in their family. The Mahuts who catch the elephant use to sing a form of song which she refined and polished to give the form of Goalpariya lokageet. This can be found in her song "O Mor Mahut Bondhu re".

Popular songs
 "Aaji Danrao Kala"
 "Afnla Kadamer Tale"
 "Bail Machhe Kheil Kare"
 "Dhick Dhick"
 "Dui Diner Bhalobasha"
 "Dung Nori Dung"
 "Ek Bar Hori Bolo Rasona"
 "Hastir Kanya"
 "Komola Sundori Nache"
 "Matir Manush"
 "Matir Pinjira"
 "O Birikha"
 "O Pare Kamrangar Gachh"
 "Oh Mor Mahut Bandhure"
 "Sonar Chand Chandre"
 "O Shyam Kaliya Re"

Awards and recognition
Pratima Barua Pandey was awarded the Padma Shri and Sangeet Natak Akademi for her pioneering efforts in popularising Goalpariya lokageet.

A documentary film made on her life and works by noted filmmaker Prabin Hazarika, Hastir Kanya, won National Film Award for Best Biographical Film in 1997, earned great appreciation and created waves at the South Asian film festival in 1998. Filmmaker Bobby Sarma Baruah started filming a full-length feature film based on Barua Pandey's life in late 2015, titled Sonar Baran Pakhi. Co-produced by ASFFDC and BB Entertainment, the film was released in December 2016.

References

1. The Times of India, 27 December 2002.
2. The Telegraph, India, 28 December 2002.
3. Sharmah, C. The Telegraph, India, 22 December 2006.
4. Barua, N. The Telegraph, India, 22 January 2005.
5. Jyotirmoi Prodhani, Life as lore: the art and time of Pratima Barua Pandey

Singers from Assam
People from Dhubri district
Assamese playback singers
1935 births
2002 deaths
Indian women folk singers
Indian folk singers
Recipients of the Padma Shri in arts
20th-century Indian singers
Indian female royalty
Women musicians from Assam
20th-century Indian women singers
Women musicians from West Bengal
Recipients of the Sangeet Natak Akademi Award